List of passive satellites is a listing of inert or mostly inert satellites, mainly of the Earth. This includes various reflector type satellites typically used for geodesy and atmospheric measurements.

Passive satellites
Calsphere	
Calsphere 1A	
Calsphere 2	
Calsphere 3	
Calsphere 4	
Calsphere 4A	
Calsphere 5
Dragsphere 1
Dragsphere 2
Enoch
Explorer 9
GFZ-1
Humanity Star
LCS-1
PAGEOS
PAMS-STU, see STS-77
POPACS
Reflector
PasComSat
Rigid Sphere 1 (AVL-802H)
Rigid Sphere 2
Sfera

Dedicated laser ranging satellites

Mostly passive satellites
Starshine 3, see Athena I
Echo project
Echo 1 (Echo 1A)
Echo 2
 Elon Musk's Tesla Roadster
Hayabusa2
Deployable camera 3 (DCAM3)
Small Carry-On Impactor (SCI)
Target Marker B
Target Marker A
Target Marker E (Explorer)
Target Marker C (Sputnik/Спутник)
 Tianwen-1
 Tianwen-1 Deployable Camera 1 
 Tianwen-1 Remote Camera
Tianwen-1 Deployable Camera 2

See also
List of laser ranging satellites
Lunar Laser Ranging experiment
Balloon satellites
Satellite geodesy

References

passive